"Kiss Me Good-Bye" is the third single by Japanese singer Angela Aki, and is the theme song of Final Fantasy XII. It was written by Aki, composed by Nobuo Uematsu and arranged by Kenichiro Fukui. Although the title version of the single is in Japanese, the version included in the game is sung in English. The single was released on March 15, 2006. The song peaked at number six on the Oricon charts.

The same year on May 16, Aki released an English version of the single as a digital single under the title "Kiss Me Good-Bye [EP]" in North America through Tofu Records.

Track listing

Charts
Kiss Me Good-bye - Oricon Sales chart (Japan)

Release history

See also
 Music of Final Fantasy XII

References

External links 
 Official discography 

Songs about kissing
2006 singles
Angela Aki songs
Final Fantasy music
Japanese-language songs
2006 songs
Songs written by Angela Aki
Songs with music by Nobuo Uematsu